Kojetice can be village:
 Kojetice (Mělník District) – village in Mělník District
 Kojetice (Třebíč District) – village in Třebíč District
 Kojetice (Ústí nad Labem) – village, part of Ústí nad Labem